BankDirect was a direct banking division of the Australian owned ASB bank, which provided internet and phone based banking in New Zealand. The bank advised customers on 29 August 2017 they will be moved to ASB products and services over the next few months.

History
BankDirect began in October 1997 and was the only bank in New Zealand to only operate via Internet and phone without any physical branches. BankDirect used the leverage of not having physical branches to offer lower home loan interest rates and higher interest rates on their savings accounts.
On 29 August 2017 BankDirect advised customers that they will be progressively moved to ASB accounts. All BankDirect customers will switch to ASB within the following months and will get new ASB credit cards/ EFTPOS cards to replace BankDirect ones.

External links
BankDirect

See also
 ASB
 Commonwealth Bank of Australia
 direct bank

References

Banks of New Zealand